Thasus acutangulus is an insect of the order Hemiptera, or the "true bugs".  As a member of the family Coreidae, it is a leaf-footed bug. It was described by the Swedish entomologist Carl Stål in 1859.

References 

Coreidae
Insects described in 1859